S. Epatha Merkerson (born November 28, 1952) is a film, stage, and television actor. She has received numerous high-profile accolades for her work, including an Emmy Award, a Golden Globe Award, a Screen Actors Guild Award, four NAACP Image Awards, two Obie Awards and two Tony Award nominations. She is best known for her award-winning portrayal of Lieutenant Anita Van Buren on the NBC police procedural drama series Law & Order, a role she played from 1993 to 2010, appearing in 388 episodes of the series. She is also known for playing Reba the Mail Lady on Pee-wee's Playhouse and Sharon Goodwin in the NBC medical drama Chicago Med since the series premiered in November 2015 (and in crossover appearances on Chicago Fire and Chicago P.D.)

Early life
Merkerson was born in Saginaw, Michigan but raised in Detroit. She is the youngest of five children (Linda Merkerson, Debbie Merkerson-Gooch, Barrie Merkerson, and Zephry Merkerson) raised by their mother, Ann, who worked for the post office.

During a segment on the January 31, 2012, episode of The Wendy Williams Show, when asked about the origin of her name, Merkerson said that "Epatha" was the name of "a grade-school teacher who was influential in keeping her father in school". Merkerson graduated from Cooley High School in 1970 and earned her Bachelor of Fine Arts in theatre at Wayne State University in 1976. She was made an Honorary Doctor of Humane Letters by Wayne State University in May 2009 and received the same distinction from the University of Maryland Eastern Shore in 2012, from Montclair State University in 2013, and from the University of Pittsburgh in 2017.

Career
In 1978 she moved to New York City.

Merkerson made her television debut as Reba the Mail Lady on Pee-wee's Playhouse. Merkerson has also appeared on The Cosby Show, among other series.

She first appeared in the NBC police procedural drama Law & Order in "Mushrooms" (Season 1: Episode 17) as the grief-stricken mother of an 11-month-old boy who is shot accidentally. Her performance impressed the producers enough to select Merkerson to replace Dann Florek as detective squad chief in the series' fourth season, making her one of the few actors to secure a recurring role after an initial single appearance on the show.

Merkerson's career began to rise after she assumed the lead role in the one-woman play Lady Day at Emerson's Bar and Grill. That was followed by her performance as Berniece in August Wilson's Pulitzer Prize–winning play The Piano Lesson. For that, she was nominated for a Tony Award as Best Featured Actress in a Play. Merkerson has also won 2 Obie Awards for her work in I'm Not Stupid and Birdie Blue, a Helen Hayes Award for The Old Settler, and a Lucille Lortel nomination for F**king A by Suzan-Lori Parks. Her screen credits include Jacob's Ladder, Loose Cannons, She's Gotta Have It, James Cameron's Terminator 2: Judgment Day; and Navy Seals.  In 2006, she won a Golden Globe Award, an Emmy Award and a Screen Actors Guild award for her performance in the HBO film Lackawanna Blues. In 2007, she starred as Lola Delaney in the Los Angeles stage production of William Inge's Come Back, Little Sheba.  In January 2008 the production opened a successful run on Broadway and earned Merkerson her second Tony nomination.

On April 1, 2010, it was confirmed that after 17 seasons, Merkerson would leave Law & Order at the end of the show's twentieth season.  Her departure from Law & Order, which aired on May 24, 2010, was also the show's final episode. In total, Merkerson appeared on the series for 17 consecutive seasons—395 episodes—which was more than any other actor associated with the program.

In 2012, Merkerson became the host of Find Our Missing, a reality-reenactment series on TV One which profiles missing people of color. She performed in Steven Spielberg's 2012 film Lincoln as Lydia Hamilton Smith, housekeeper to Tommy Lee Jones's character, Congressman Thaddeus Stevens.

In 2014, Merkerson appeared in the Primary Stages production of While I Yet Live, written by Billy Porter. In 2015, she joined the cast of NBC medical drama Chicago Med as Sharon Goodwin, Chief of Patient and Medical Services. The series was conceived and written by Law & Order creator Dick Wolf, along with Matt Olmstead, Derek Haas and Michael Brandt. 2014, Merkerson became a spokesperson for Merck America's Diabetes Challenge, to increase Type 2 diabetes awareness among African Americans.

Personal life
Merkerson appeared on the television series of Henry Louis Gates' Finding Your Roots on February 5, 2019 (Season 5, Episode 5), in which he revealed that she was a descendant of Isaac Hawkins and eight others of the 272 enslaved people who were sold in the 1838 Jesuit slave sale by Jesuit priests. These priests owned plantations on which the enslaved people tilled tobacco; proceeds from the sale were used to pay off the debts of the Jesuit-operated Georgetown College (now Georgetown University).

Filmography

Film

Television

Awards and nominations
Awards
 1992 Obie Award Outstanding Performance (I'm Not Stupid)
 1999 Helen Hayes Award Outstanding Lead Actress-Resident Play (The Old Settler)
 2002 Regulus Award For her dedication to lung cancer awareness and education
 2005 Emmy Award for Outstanding Lead Actress in a Miniseries or a Movie (Lackawanna Blues)
 2006 SunDeis Film Festival at Brandeis University Entertainer of the Year Award
 2006 Screen Actors Guild Award Outstanding Performance by a Female Actor in a Television Movie or Miniseries (Lackawanna Blues)
 2006 PRISM Award Performance in a TV-Movie or Miniseries (Lackawanna Blues)
 2006 Obie Award Outstanding Performance (Birdie Blue)
 2006 NAACP Image Award Best Supporting Actress in a Drama Series (Law & Order)
 2006 NAACP Image Award Best Actress in a Made for TV Movie, Miniseries or Dramatic Special (Lackawanna Blues)
 2006 Gracie Allen Award Outstanding Female Lead – Miniseries (Lackawanna Blues)
 2006 Golden Globe Award for Best Performance by an Actress in a Mini-Series or a Motion Picture Made for Television (Lackawanna Blues)
 2006 Black Reel Award Best Actress in a Made for TV Movie or Miniseries (Lackawanna Blues)
 2010 NAACP Image Award Best Supporting Actress in a Drama Series (Law & Order)
 2011 NAACP Image Award Best Supporting Actress in a Drama Series (Law & Order)
 2017 Honorary Degree,
Doctor of Letters,
University of Pittsburgh 
 2013 Honorary Degree, Doctor of Letters, 
Montclair State University
 2012 Honorary Degree, Doctor of Letters, University of Maryland Eastern Shore
 2009 Honorary Degree,
Doctor of Letters, 
Wayne State University 

Nominations
 1990 Helen Hayes Award Best Actress, Non-Resident Play (The Piano Lesson)
 1990 Drama Desk Award Best Actress, Lead Role-Play (The Piano Lesson)
 1990 Tony Nomination  Best Actress, Featured Role-Play (The Piano Lesson)
 1997 NAACP Image Award Outstanding Lead Actress in a Drama Series (Law & Order)
 1998 NAACP Image Award Outstanding Lead Actress in a Drama Series (Law & Order)
 1999 NAACP Image Award Outstanding Lead Actress in a Drama Series (Law & Order)
 2001 NAACP Image Award Outstanding Lead Actress in a Drama Series (Law & Order)
 2003 Lucille Lortel Award Outstanding Lead Actress (Fucking A)
 2003 Drama League Award Distinguished Performance (Fucking A)
 2005 Satellite Award Outstanding Actress in a Miniseries or a Motion Picture Made for Television (Lackawanna Blues)
 2006 Vision Award Best Dramatic Performance (Lackawanna Blues)
 2006 Lucille Lortel Award Best Actress (Birdie Blue)
 2006 Independent Spirit Nomination  Best Female Lead (Lackawanna Blues)
 2006 Drama League Award Distinguished Performance (Birdie Blue)
 2007 NAACP Image Award Best Supporting Actress in a Drama Series (Law & Order)
 2008 NAACP Image Award Best Supporting Actress in a Drama Series (Law & Order)
 2008 NAACP Image Award Nomination Best Actress in a Made for TV Movie, Miniseries or Dramatic Special (Girl, Positive)
 2008 Tony Award Nomination Best Performance by a Leading Actress in a Play (Come Back, Little Sheba)
 2008 NAACP Theatre Award Best Lead Female – Equity (Come Back, Little Sheba)

References

External links
 
 
 

1952 births
20th-century American actresses
21st-century American actresses
Actresses from Detroit
Best Miniseries or Television Movie Actress Golden Globe winners
Living people
Obie Award recipients
Outstanding Performance by a Lead Actress in a Miniseries or Movie Primetime Emmy Award winners
Outstanding Performance by a Female Actor in a Miniseries or Television Movie Screen Actors Guild Award winners
People from Saginaw, Michigan
Wayne State University alumni
American television actresses
African-American actresses
American film actresses
20th-century African-American women singers
American musical theatre actresses
American stage actresses
Eastern Michigan University alumni
Indiana University Bloomington alumni
Cooley High School alumni
21st-century African-American women
21st-century African-American people